This is a list of Webster University campus locations.

Locations

U.S. Locations
A campus location provides student services and offers all classes a student would need to complete a degree. Webster University operates the following campus locations throughout the United States:

 Albuquerque Metropolitan Campus – N.M.; opened October 1985.
 Andrews Air Force Base – Md.; opened June 2004.
 Bolling Air Force Base – D.C.; opened May 1987.
 Beaufort Naval Hospital – S.C.; opened August 1979.
 Bureau of Medicine and Surgery – D.C.; opened June 2003.
 Brooks City-Base – Texas; opened January 1976.
 Camp Bullis – Texas; opened September 2006.
 Camp Lejeune – N.C.; opened October 1993.
 Charleston Air Force Base – S.C.; opened August 1975.
 Charleston Metropolitan Campus – S.C.; opened April 2004.
 Charleston Naval Base – S.C.; opened August 1975.
 Colorado Springs Metropolitan Campus – Colo.; opened October 1985.
 Columbia Metropolitan Campus – S.C.; opened August 2000.
 Denver Metropolitan Campus – Colo.; opened March 1983.
 Edwards Air Force Base – Calif.; opened October 1998.
 Elgin Metropolitan Campus – Illl.; opened January 2008; formerly Crystal Lake Campus; formerly Chicago Metropolitan Campus.
 Fairchild Air Force Base – Wash.; opened October 1999.
 Fayetteville Regional Campus – Ark.; opened January 1999.
 Fort Belvoir – Va.; opened January 2005.
 Fort Bliss – Texas; opened October 1976.
 Fort Bragg – N.C.; opened August 2001.
 Fort Irwin – Calif.; opened August 2002.
 Fort Jackson – S.C.; opened August 1983.
 Fort Leavenworth – Kan.; Command and General Staff College; opened January 1998.
 Fort Leonard Wood – Mo.; opened August 1974.
 Fort Sam Houston – Texas; opened January 1976.
 Fort Sill – Okla.; opened October 1989.
 Fort Smith Metropolitan Campus – Ark.; opened May 1989.
 Fort Stewart – Ga.; opened August 2002.
 Gateway Campus – Downtown St. Louis, Missouri; opened September 1974 as Downtown St. Louis; moved to Old Post Office in January 2006; moved to the Arcade Building in January 2016. 
 Great Lakes Naval Base – Ill.; opened October 1975.
 Greenville Metropolitan Campus – S.C.; opened August 1993.
 Hill Air Force Base – Utah; opened October 2000.
 Hunter Army Air Field – Ga.; opened August 2002.
 Irvine Metropolitan Campus – Calif.; opened January 1993.
 Jacksonville Metropolitan Campus – Fla.; opened May 1993.
 Jacksonville Naval Air Station – Fla.; opened August 1990.
 Kansas City Metropolitan Campus – Mo.,; August 1979
 Kirtland Air Force Base – N.M.; opened October 1977.
 Lackland Air Force Base – Texas; opened January 1990.
 Lakeland and Brandon Campus – Fla.; opened January 1999.
 Little Rock Air Force Base – Ark.; opened March 1975.
 Little Rock Metropolitan Campus – Ark; opened May 1986.
 Los Angeles Air Force Base – Calif.; opened August 1997.
 Luke Air Force Base – Ariz.; opened August 2000.
 Louisville Metropolitan Campus – Ky.; opened March 1981; formerly Jefferson Metropolitan Campus, Ind.
 Marymount Webster Weekend College – Calif.; opened November 1994.
 McConnell Air Force Base – Kan.; opened May 1976.
 Memphis Naval Support Activity – Tenn.; opened January 2002.
 Merritt Island Campus – Fla.; opened August 1995.
 Moody Air Force Base – Ga.; opened August 2003.
 Myrtle Beach Metropolitan Campus – S.C.; opened January 2003.
 Ocala Metropolitan Campus – Fla.; opened October 1997.
 Orlando Metropolitan Campus – Fla.; opened September 1990.
 Orlando South Campus – Fla.; opened October 1995.
 Ozarks Regional Campus – Springfield, Mo.; opened August 1998.
 Palm Bay Campus – Fla.; opened March 1997.
 Patrick Space Force Base – Fla.; opened August 2002.
 Peterson Air Force Base – Colo.; opened August 1977.
 Pope Air Force Base – N.C.; opened October 1975.
 Randolph Air Force Base – Texas; opened January 2002.
 Rolla Metropolitan Campus – Mo.; opened March 1996.
 San Diego Metropolitan Campus – Calif.; opened May 1989. CLOSED
 Sarasota-Manatee Metropolitan Campus – Fla.; opened August 2000.
 Shaw Air Force Base – S.C.; opened March 2003.
 Scott Air Force Base – Ill.; opened April 1974.
 St. Louis home campus – Mo.; opened September 1915.
 Tampa Bay Metropolitan Campus – St. Petersburg, Fla.; opened in March 2007; also known as St. Petersburg Metropolitan campus.
 Tinker Air Force Base – Okla.; opened January 1990.
 Westport – St. Louis, Mo.; opened October 1983; moved from Northwest Plaza in 2004.
 Whiteman Air Force Base – Mo.; opened March 1991.
 WingHaven – St. Charles, Mo.; opened August 2002.

The subsequent campus groups include the following:

 Charleston area campuses – includes Charleston Air Force Base; Charleston Metropolitan Campus; and Charleston Naval Base.
 Orlando campuses – includes Orlando Metropolitan Campus and Orlando South Campus.
 San Antonio campuses – includes Brooks City-Base; Camp Bullis; Lackland Air Force Base; and Fort Sam Houston.
 Space Coast campuses – includes Merritt Island Campus; Palm Bay Campus; Patrick Space Force Base; and offerings at Northrop Grumman Corp.
 St. Louis area campuses – includes St. Louis home campus; Old Post Office; Westport Campus; WingHaven Campus; and Scott Air Force Base (Ill.)
 Tampa Bay area campuses – includes Lakeland and Brandon; Sarasota-Manatee; and St. Petersburg.

International Locations

Webster University maintains 10 campus locations around the world, including:

 Bangkok, Thailand – Webster University Thailand
 Cha-am/Hua Hin, Thailand – Webster University Thailand
 Chengdu, China – Webster China
 Geneva, Switzerland – Webster University Geneva Website 
 Leiden, Netherlands – Webster Leiden Website 
 London, England – Webster Graduate School at Regent's College
 Shanghai, China – Webster China
 Shenzhen, China – Webster China
 Vienna, Austria – Webster University Vienna
 Accra, Ghana – Webster Ghana
 Tashkent, Uzbekistan – Webster Uzbekistan Website

References

Webster University